Pongine gammaherpesvirus 2 (PoHV-2), commonly known as orangutan herpesvirus, is a species of virus in the genus Lymphocryptovirus, subfamily Gammaherpesvirinae, family Herpesviridae, and order Herpesvirales.

It infects orangutans (Pongo).

References

External links
 

Gammaherpesvirinae